Anthony Russell Foresta (born May 20, 1976) is an American vocalist who is the lead singer of crossover thrash bands Municipal Waste, Iron Reagan and (since 2022) the supergroup Heaven's Gate which he helped co-found with Cannibal Corpse drummer Paul Mazurkiewicz and who are in the process of recording new material.

Foresta founded Municipal Waste in 2001 with Ryan Waste, Andy Harris, and Brendan Trache. In 2012, Foresta, along with Municipal Waste bandmate Phil Hall, Ryan Parrish, and Paul Burnette formed Iron Reagan.

Recording history

With Municipal Waste
 Municipal Waste (2001, Amendment Records / Busted Heads Records)
 Municipal Waste / Crucial Unit (2002, Six Weeks Records)
 Tango and Thrash (w/Bad Acid Trip) (2003, Mordar Records)
 Waste 'Em All (2003, Six Weeks Records)
 Louder Than Hell (2005, Six Weeks Records)
 Hazardous Mutation (2005, Earache Records)
 The Art of Partying (2007, Earache Records)
 Massive Aggressive (2009, Earache Records)
"Scion Presents: Municipal Waste (2012, Scion Audio Visual)
 The Fatal Feast (2012, Nuclear Blast Records)
 Garbage Pack (2012, Night of the Vinyl Dead Records)
 Toxic Waste (w/ Toxic Holocaust) (2012, Tankcrimes Records)
 Slime and Punishment (2017, Nuclear Blast Records)
 The Last Rager (2019, Nuclear Blast Records)
 Electrified Brain (2022, Nuclear Blast Records)

With Iron ReaganDemo 2012 (2012, Tankcrimes)Worse Than Dead (2013, A389)Exhumed/Iron Reagan (2014, Tankcrimes)Spoiled Identity EP (2014, Magic Bullet / A389)The Tyranny of Will (2014, Relapse)Iron Reagan/Toxic Shock (2015, Reflections)Crossover Ministry (2017, Relapse)Iron Reagan/Gatecreeper (2018, Relapse)Dark Days Ahead (2018, Pop Wig)

With Heaven's Gate

 Heaven's Gate (2023, Beach Impediment)

Guest appearances
 Pasadena Napalm Division (2013) by Pasadena Napalm Division − guest vocals on "Murder the Bearded Lady Killer"
 Hang Ten'' (2014) by Ghoul − guest vocals on "Kreeg"

References

External links
Tony Foresta on Twitter

1976 births
Living people
American heavy metal singers
20th-century American singers
21st-century American singers
Music of Richmond, Virginia
Musicians from Richmond, Virginia
20th-century American male singers
21st-century American male singers